"Alcohol Is Free" is a song performed by Koza Mostra and Agathonas Iakovidis. It was the Greek entry for the Eurovision Song Contest in 2013, where it eventually came 6th at the finals. It was composed as a mix of ska, punk and rebetiko music styles. The song's chorus is sung in English while the rest of it is in Greek. It was performed at Eurovision with the performers wearing kilts. The song also included a number of allusions to the Greek government-debt crisis and a feeling of suffering as a result of it.

Eurovision
At the Eurovision Song Contest, "Alcohol is Free" was placed in the second semi-final where it was performed 9th in the running order. The song was voted through to compete in the final. There it was selected to play 21st in the Eurovision final running order. The song eventually finished 6th in the competition after receiving the maximum of 12 points from Cyprus and San Marino while also receiving high marks from Albania, Armenia, Russia, and the United Kingdom. "Alcohol is Free" was also the highest-ranking song not sung primarily in English.

The song was praised by critics, with the British Daily Mirror newspaper calling it "certifiably brilliant madness". A panel of music critics rated it as 67%. Czech musician Stano Simor criticized its melody as being too similar to Russian folk songs. Neos Kosmos, a Greek-Australian newspaper, opined that "Alcohol is Free" had gained a cult following because it contrasted with Europop music while maintaining Greek folk music.

Chart performance

Weekly charts

References

Eurovision songs of 2013
Eurovision songs of Greece
2013 songs
Greek-language songs
2013 singles
Number-one singles in Greece
Songs about alcohol